John Bevan (born 3 August 1938) is a British clarinettist, saxophonist, conductor and orchestra leader who emigrated to Norway in 1969. Bevan now lives in Nesodden, Akershus, Norway.

John Bevan was born in Catshill, England, and showed interest for music at the early age of eight years, starting on the violin at Catshill Junior school. After a 3-year period, his interests were directed to the clarinet. At 12 years old, he was accepted as a part-time student at the Birmingham School of Music. He was fortunate to have received professional tuition from members of both Birmingham Symphony Orchestra (James Mathewson) and BBC Light Orchestra (Michael Saxton). His initial interests were directed towards classical music, and he was very active with several local amateur orchestras and also a regular feature in the theatre pit orchestras in the Birmingham area.

Achievements
At the age of 14, John was an original member of the newly formed Worcestershire County Youth Orchestra under the batons of Eric Holt and Arther Benoy. At the age of 19 he was performed solo with the orchestra Concertino for Clarinet and Strings by Gorden Jacob at Kidderminster Town Hall. During this period, John also showed interest in the lighter side of music; he purchased his first alto saxophone at the age of 16. This was unique as it was an instrument made with plastic by the name of Grafton Acrylic. This was soon traded in after a 2-year period for the best instrument on the market at the time – a Selmer Mark VI Alto which he still owns. This instrument is now rated as the Stradivarius of saxophones by experienced players. A Dearmann baritone saxophone was also added to his collection of instruments which opened the market for him in many big bands of the time.

Conscription
In 1959, he was conscripted into the army stationed at Woolwich, London, as a musician in the Royal Artillery Staff Band. This was short-lived due to a compassionate discharge owing to the unexpected death of his father at a very early age. This did not quell his interest for music, however, and he formed the John Bevan Quartet, which became popular in the Birmingham area and also was the regular feature at the Perry Hall Hotel, Bromsgrove for many years. Classical music at this time was not the forefront of his musical activities but an opportunity presented itself in 1962 when the Bromsgrove Music Festival invited him to perform. With able assistance from the Bromsgrove String Orchestra under the conductorship of Joseph Stones he performed Richard Strauss's Duo Concerto for Bassoon and Clarinet. John was honoured to partner with Harold Evans, principle bassoonist with the Birmingham Symphony Orchestra.

Move to Norway
After an eight-year period living at Windmill Avenue, Rubery, John and his wife, Joan, left England in 1969 with their two children, Andrew and Colin, and took up residence in Norway. Within a short period he was invited to join the Nesodden Amateur Orchestra. Within a four-year period he conducted the local youth and school bands and also the Oslo Post Office orchestra. From the connections he had established with local musicians he formed an eighteen piece combination which later became known as the John Bevan Big Band.  From these very basic beginnings the band enjoyed a great deal of success in a relatively short time. It established a working arrangement with NADU (Norway's Amateur Dancing Association) and performed on several occasions for their National Championships. In 1978 Norway was allocated the World Championship in Latin American Dancing and the Bevan band were honoured to be chosen for this prestigious arrangement. Norway took both second and third places in this competition.

In 1980 Norway hosted the Paralympic Winter Games where the orchestra once again showed its skills in the international field.

In August 1986 the band was dealt a terrible blow.  On returning from vacation after celebrating their Silver Wedding anniversary they were informed that Oslo's Rainbow Restaurant, the building where they would usually rehearse, had had a serious fire which damaged virtually everything within. The band's library of music was completely destroyed with the exception of the performing folders which were located at another store. This saved them and they got many new engagements. The library at that time had a total of 750 arrangements which is now somewhat depleted to a total of 550. 
  
Due to their constant achievements the orchestra became very much in demand and developed to become one of Norway's leading and most extensively used orchestras. With this success it captivated the interest of many professional musicians, and the quality of the band also benefited from this.  Many of the top Norwegian and international artists were accompanied; Georgie Fame, Vera Lynn, Kenny Clare, Jack Dailey, Jan Harrington, Lill Babs, Lennart Hyland, Garry Allcock and Putte Wickman are just some of the artists who performed with the band. Jimmy Staples, correspondent with the English jazz magazine Crescendo, was not only performing himself but also provided some excellent scores for the orchestra.

The orchestra was constantly engaged for dance occasions and broadcast transmissions for Norwegian radio and TV. In cooperation with arranger Erling Wicklund, the John Bevan Big Band produced their one and only LP entitled "The Great Walt Disney Film Tunes." This was extremely well received due to the professional expertise of Erling Wicklund, and Norway's leading jazz critic, Stein Kagge, gave the record top marks for the final production with the heading "a Norwegian Big Band in an international class".

Another milestone in their history was in 1984, when they were invited to perform for the Istanbul Music Festival accompanying the local Turkish vocalist IBO in the Istanbul Opera House. The band also had the honour of performing at a large Turkish wedding.

References

1938 births
Living people
English clarinetists
British classical clarinetists
English classical saxophonists
English people of Welsh descent
British male saxophonists
English conductors (music)
British male conductors (music)
British emigrants to Norway
21st-century saxophonists
21st-century British conductors (music)
21st-century clarinetists
21st-century British male musicians
People from Nesodden